is a former Japanese football player. She played for Japan national team.

Club career
Kaji was born on 28 June 1964. She played for Tasaki Kobe. In 1989, she was selected Best Eleven L.League first season.

National team career
On 6 September 1981, when Kaji was 17 years old, she debuted for Japan national team against England. She played at 1986, 1989, 1991 AFC Championship and 1990 Asian Games. She was also a member of Japan for 1991 World Cup. This competition was her last game for Japan. She played 48 games for Japan until 1991.

National team statistics

References

External links
 

1964 births
Living people
Japanese women's footballers
Japan women's international footballers
Nadeshiko League players
Tasaki Perule FC players
Footballers at the 1990 Asian Games
1991 FIFA Women's World Cup players
Women's association football defenders
Asian Games silver medalists for Japan
Asian Games medalists in football
Medalists at the 1990 Asian Games